A tufted angioma (also known as an "Acquired tufted angioma," "Angioblastoma," "Angioblastoma of Nakagawa," "Hypertrophic hemangioma," "Progressive capillary hemangioma," and "Tufted hemangioma") usually develops in infancy or early childhood on the neck and upper trunk, and is an ill-defined, dull red macule with a mottled appearance, varying from 2 to 5 cm in diameter.

See also
 List of cutaneous conditions
Skin lesion

References

External links 

Dermal and subcutaneous growths